BBC North West Tonight is the BBC's regional television news programme covering North West England and the Isle of Man. Produced by BBC North West, the programme airs at 1.30pm (as North West Today), 6.30pm and 10.30pm, with shorter bulletins during BBC Breakfast and at the weekends. The programme is broadcast from the BBC's MediaCityUK studios at Salford Quays, with district newsrooms based in Liverpool, Blackburn and Chester.

BBC North West region
The BBC North West region covers Cheshire, Greater Manchester, Lancashire, Merseyside, northwestern Derbyshire, southern Cumbria, western North Yorkshire, western West Yorkshire and the Isle of Man.

The programme can be watched in any part of the United Kingdom (and Europe) from Astra 1N on Freesat channel 955 and Sky channel 958. The latest edition of BBC North West Tonight is also available to watch on BBC iPlayer for 24 hours, like the BBC's other television news bulletins.

History
BBC television news from Manchester began on 30 September 1957, with a nightly bulletin entitled News from the North, broadcast to the whole of Northern England from the Holme Moss and Pontop Pike transmitters.

The rival ITV station, Granada Television, had already begun providing regional news coverage when it began broadcasting in May 1956, at first covering the North West only before extending to Yorkshire six months later.

For the first two years, the short weeknight bulletins were produced and broadcast from the BBC's Dickenson Road television studio at Rusholme in south Manchester.

The TV news service was refocused to cover the North West and Yorkshire areas, when separate bulletins for the North East and Cumbria were introduced in 1959.

At this point, production moved to a small studio at Broadcasting House, situated above a bank at Piccadilly Gardens and shared with the BBC's radio and newsgathering facilities in Manchester.

By 1962, the nightly bulletins had been extended to 20 minutes and evolved into the magazine programme North at Six, later renamed as Look North.

On 25 March 1968, the Manchester edition of Look North was again refocused to cover the North West area, following the launch of a third Look North programme from Leeds. The programme was renamed in 1980 as Look North West, with News North West introduced for shorter bulletins.

On 18 May 1981, Look North West moved from Piccadilly Gardens to New Broadcasting House on nearby Oxford Road. BBC North West Tonight was introduced on 3 September 1984 to coincide with the launch of the BBC Six O'Clock News.

Between 1986 and 1989, the programme also covered parts of Cumbria previously served by the Newcastle edition of Look North and provided a news opt-out for the area at lunchtime. Following viewer complaints, Cumbrian news coverage was switched back to the Newcastle edition of Look North.

The last edition of the programme from Studio B at New Broadcasting House on Oxford Road aired on 27 November 2011 and was also the last broadcast from the studios after 36 years of operation. The programme's first broadcast from the BBC's Salford Quays studios took place the following day, during the BBC Breakfast programme. BBC North West Tonight and BBC Breakfast now share the same studio.

Broadcast times

BBC North West Today
On weekdays, breakfast bulletins air as part of BBC Breakfast at 25 and 55 minutes past the hour, between 6:25am and 9:00am. A 15-minute lunchtime bulletin airs at 1:30pm, following the BBC News at One.

BBC North West Tonight
The main edition of BBC North West Tonight is broadcast every weeknight between 6.30pm and 7.00pm. A late-night edition of the programme is broadcast (the 15-minute bulletins airs Monday to Friday at 10.30pm), following the BBC News at Ten.

BBC North West Tonight airs short early evening bulletins on Saturday and Sunday evenings, although times vary. A late-night bulletin is broadcast on Sundays, following the BBC News at Ten.

Presenters

Notable current presenters

Main presenters
Roger Johnson
Annabel Tiffin

Weather presenters
 Kay Crewdson
Simon King

Former presenters
Notable former main anchors include Stuart Hall, John Mundy, Gordon Burns, and Ranvir Singh.

For 38 years, Dave Guest was chief reporter, as well as a presenter, producer and editor of BBC North West Tonight. He retired on 23 October 2020.

Dianne Oxberry was the programme's first dedicated weather presenter, working on the programme until shortly before her sudden death from ovarian cancer in January 2019.

 Rachael Bland
 Gordon Burns
 Felicity Goodey
 Dave Guest
 Stuart Flinders
 Mark Edwardson
 Owain Wyn Evans
 Stuart Hall
 Philip Hayton
 Eddie Hemmings
 Martin Henfield
 Tony Livesey
 Tony Morris
 John Mundy
 Dianne Oxberry
 Winifred Robinson
 Phil Sayer
 Ranvir Singh
 Nina Warhurst

References

External links
 

BBC Regional News shows
Mass media in Lancashire
Mass media in Merseyside
Mass media in Manchester
North West England
1990s British television series
2000s British television series
2010s British television series
2020s British television series
1984 British television series debuts
English-language television shows
Television news in England
Television news in the Isle of Man